Joyce Glacier is a glacier in Antarctica, immediately north of Péwé Peak, draining from the névé northeast of Catacomb Hill and terminating  up-valley (west) of the snout of Garwood Glacier, which would have been a tributary to it in times of more intense glaciation. It was named by the New Zealand Blue Glacier party (1956–57) after Ernest Joyce, a member of British Antarctic expeditions of 1901–04, 1907–09 and 1914–17.

See also
Colleen Lake
Lake Buddha

References

Glaciers of Victoria Land
Scott Coast